Uncle Acid & the Deadbeats (written as Uncle Acid and the deadbeats or simply Uncle Acid) are an English rock band, formed in Cambridge by Kevin Starrs. The band have released five albums – the most recent, Wasteland, was released in October 2018 – as well as a number of singles. The band appears regularly at festivals around Europe.

Biography
The band's music is heavily influenced by the late 1960s when heavy metal was emerging. Allmusic praised the band's ability to recreate a particular aspect of this era, describing the band as "celebrating the Summer of Love's soul-chilling autumn: a blasted landscape, post-flower power, resembling Altamont's killing fields, reeking of the Manson Family murders, and, naturally, sounding like a mish-mash of all of the apocalyptic musical forces that converged upon that era".

The band has been described as "the original Alice Cooper band jamming in a cell with early Black Sabbath and the Stooges". In order to replicate the sound of that era, the band uses vintage instruments and recording equipment.

The band’s name was taken from Rusty Day, the singer of Cactus, who later had a band called Uncle Acid and the Permanent Damage Band. Uncle Acid was originally the otherwise-anonymous frontman, although he has since changed his stage name to K.R. Starrs and now views the band members collectively as being "Uncle Acid".

Blood Lust was the band's breakthrough album, with The Quietus describing it as "a glorious and idiosyncratic collection that quickly garnered rabid cult status amongst the worldwide doom fraternity" and Decibel Magazine referring to it as "a groovy, evil delight". Allmusic described Blood Lust as "a mixture of psychedelic rock's harrowing comedown, garage and punk rock's nihilistic ascent, and the earliest manifestations of heavy metal's occult-laced, nerve-damaging bludgeon".  The album garnered substantial acclaim, for which K.R. Starrs remarked, "It kind of took everyone by surprise that the album took off the way it did".

With the release of the band's third album, Mind Control, more 1970s pop influences were incorporated into the music.  A concept album, K.R. Starrs explained that Mind Control is a "fictional story ... about a cult leader who comes down from the mountain and brainwashes his desert disciples through drugs, love, violence, and intimidation". According to Metacritic, the album has received "universal acclaim" with a score of 81 based on 7 critics. Justin Norton, writing for Decibel Magazine, awarded the album a score of 8 out of 10 and described the album as "a perfect union of Sabbath riffs, fuzz and Herschell Gordon Lewis".

Band members
Current members
"Uncle Acid" (Kevin R. Starrs) – lead guitar, lead vocals, organ (2009–present)
Vaughn Stokes – rhythm guitar, backing vocals (2015–present)
Jon Rice – drums (2017–present)
Justin Smith – bass (2018–present)

Former members
"Kat" – bass (2009–2011)
Dean Millar – bass, backing vocals (2012–2015)
"Red" – drums (2009–2011)
Thomas Mowforth – drums (2012–2013)
Itamar Rubinger – drums (2013–2016)
Yotam Rubinger – rhythm guitar, backing vocals (2012–2016)

Timeline

Discography

Albums
Volume 1 (2010)
Blood Lust (2011)
Mind Control (2013)
The Night Creeper (2015)
Wasteland (2018)

Singles
"White Nights of Murder" / "I'll Cut You Down" – split with Danava (2011)
"Poison Apple" (2013)
"Mind Crawler" (2013)
"Sharon Tate Experience – Christmas Killer" (2013)
"Down to the Fire" – Track 2 on Something in the Water – A Rise Above Compilation (2013)
"Runaway Girls" (2014)
"Waiting for Blood" (2015)
"Melody Lane" (2015)
"Pusher Man" / "Remember Tomorrow" (Iron Maiden cover) (2016)
"Crystal Spiders" (2017)
"Dead Eyes of London" (2017)
"Stranger Tonight" (2018)
"Shockwave City" (2018)

Tours
The band toured internationally during 2013 and 2014, and played at festivals including Roadburn, Download, Hellfest, Roskilde, Bukta Tromsø Open Air Festival, Montreaux Jazz Festival, Øya Festival, Valkhof, Beacons, Reading and Leeds Festivals, Off Festival and Soundwave. They supported Black Sabbath on 16 dates of their Reunion Tour in Europe in November and December 2013. After touring in New Zealand, Australia and Europe in early 2014, their schedule for 2014 included Maryland Deathfest, Nova Rock Festival, Eurockéennes, Copenhell and Pukkelpop festival.

After selling out 13 of 15 dates on their first-ever North American tour (supported by Danava) in September 2014, Uncle Acid & the Deadbeats returned to North America in September/October 2015 to start Part 1 of The Night Creeper Tour with support from Ruby the Hatchet and Ecstatic Vision. From there they traveled to Europe and the UK in October/November with support from Spiders (SE).

In February 2020, the band announced that they would be going on a tour of the United States; however, it was later canceled due to the 2020 COVID-19 pandemic.

In April and May 2022, the band was one of the support acts for the European leg of Ghost's Imperatour.

References

External links

 

English heavy metal musical groups
Metal Blade Records artists
Musical groups from Cambridge
English stoner rock musical groups